Mega Man X4, originally released in Japan as , is a video game developed by Capcom. It is the fourth game in the  Mega Man X series and the second game in the series to be released on the Sega Saturn and PlayStation. The two versions were released simultaneously in Japan in 1997. A North America release followed sometime thereafter, while Europe received only the PlayStation version in 1997.

Taking place in the 22nd century, the Mega Man X series is set in a society populated by humans and intelligent robots called "Reploids". A military taskforce called the "Maverick Hunters" is implemented to suppress the uprising of "Mavericks", Reploids that begin to exhibit dangerous and destructive behavior. Mega Man X4 follows two such hunters, X and Zero, as they become involved in a conflict between the Hunters and a Reploid army called the "Repliforce". Mega Man X4 is an action-platform game in the same vein as other installments in the series. The player completes a set of eight stages in any order while fighting enemies, gaining power-ups, and winning the special weapon of each stage's boss. Unlike previous games in the series, Mega Man X4 allows the player to choose between the two protagonists at the beginning of the game: X, who uses traditional, long-range attacks; or Zero, who wields a short-range sword.

Critical reception for Mega Man X4 has been generally positive. Critics praised the ability to play as either X or Zero, a concept many found to expand upon the then perceived exhausted gameplay formula of the Mega Man X sub-franchise during the 1990s. However, it was criticized for its lack of innovation and its voice acting.  In addition to its console versions, the game was released on Windows worldwide in 1998 and 1999 and on Japanese mobile phones in 2011 and 2012. It was also included on the Mega Man X Collection, a compilation released in North America on the PlayStation 2 and Nintendo GameCube in 2006. Mega Man X4 was made available on the PlayStation Network as part of the PSOne Classics line for North America and Japan in 2014. It was given a new release on the PC, as well as given ports for the PlayStation 4, Xbox One, and Nintendo Switch as part of Mega Man X Legacy Collection (Rockman X Anniversary Collection in Japan) which was released on July 24, 2018 worldwide and July 26, 2018 in Japan.

Plot

The storyline differs slightly depending on whether the player chooses X or Zero. Mega Man X4 takes place in an ambiguous year in the 22nd century (21XX), where humans coexist with intelligent androids called "Reploids". Following the third defeat of Sigma, a second Maverick Hunting group has arisen. The army, called the "Repliforce", is a military regime led by the giant Reploid General and his second-in-command, Colonel. Behind the scenes, Sigma has been trying to convince General that the Hunters are dangerous, and will turn on him. General dismisses Sigma, unwilling to betray the humans. Zero, meanwhile, is plagued by a recurring nightmare: a mysterious figure awakens him, calls him a "masterpiece", then orders him to destroy an unknown target.

The Sky Lagoon, a massive floating city, is sent crashing down onto the city below it, killing countless humans and Reploids. Either X or Zero is dispatched to investigate possible causes of the disaster, only to become entangled in a struggle to save the world. At the crash site, X and Zero encounter Colonel, and attempt to bring him back to Maverick Hunter HQ for investigation. Colonel denies Repliforce's involvement in the Sky Lagoon destruction, and refuses to disarm out of pride. Zero also rescues Iris, Colonel's kind-hearted sister, who was caught in the mayhem but is unharmed, and sends her to headquarters. The Repliforce thus begins a movement to claim independence from the human government and create a nation for Reploids only.

Back at headquarters, X is greeted by a rookie Hunter named Double, while Zero rendezvouses with Iris. Double and Iris outline the locations of the Reploid leaders who have sworn their loyalty to Repliforce, as well as Mavericks unaffiliated with Repliforce that are spreading chaos. Once four of the eight Mavericks are defeated, Colonel issues a challenge to X and Zero, which he either escapes from after defeat (X) or is stopped by the intervention of Iris (Zero). Once all eight Mavericks are beaten, X and Zero are sent to a space port where Colonel guards Repliforce's launch into outer space; Colonel dies after an ensuing battle. X and Zero infiltrate the Repliforce's space station, known as the Final Weapon, which is capable of destroying all human life on Earth. X must fight Double, who is revealed to be a double agent sent to gain information from the Hunters. Zero is forced to battle Iris, who is torn between the ideals of her brother and her feelings for Zero. Zero kills Iris in the confrontation, which causes him to break down in an existential crisis, as he questions his ideals and motives. Once Double, Iris, and General are defeated, Sigma reveals he caused the Sky Lagoon crash in order to instigate the conflict between the Maverick Hunters and Repliforce, and announces his intention to wipe out humanity. Additionally in Zero's scenario, Sigma reminds Zero of the time that Sigma led the Maverick Hunters, and of a vicious battle between the two that ended with Zero's apprehension as a Maverick. In the end, Sigma is destroyed, but reveals he already activated the Final Weapon. General then appears and sacrifices himself to destroy the Final Weapon, allowing X and Zero to escape and return to Earth.

In X's ending, he thinks back to the battles he had endured. Zero contacts X and tells him to return to Earth to rest. X begs Zero to promise to take care of him, should he become a Maverick himself. Zero tells X not to have such thoughts. In Zero's ending, he is wrought with pain and guilt for being unable to save any of the Repliforce members, and becomes heartbroken over the death of Iris. He then wonders to himself if all Reploids are destined to become Mavericks.

Gameplay

The gameplay in Mega Man X4 is similar to the previous installments of the Mega Man X series. The player is presented with a series of action-platforming stages that can be cleared in any order desired. In these stages, the player must avoid obstacles like falling debris and spikes, and destroy enemy robots to reach the end of the stages. The player character retains the capabilities from previous entries in the Mega Man X series like dashing and scaling walls. Some levels contain ridable vehicles such as hover bikes and armored-mecha. Each of the eight initial stages contains one Maverick boss, and defeating this boss gives the player a new ability. Every boss is weak to a particular ability, adding an element of strategy to the order in which the player completes the stages.

New to Mega Man X4 is the ability to play through the game either as X or Zero fully, (while Zero was playable in Mega Man X3, he acted only as a backup for X). The two characters cannot be switched during a playthrough. Though both of them go through the same stages, they operate differently and are challenged differently from the terrain. X wields the "X-Buster", a plasma cannon on his arm that he uses to attack foes from a distance. It can be charged to fire stronger shots. A new weapon is given to the player with each boss defeated while playing as X. These weapons have limited ammunition, displayed by a meter next to one's health, both of which can be refilled by picking up power-ups dropped by destroyed enemies. In some stages, the player can find hidden capsules that contain armor upgrades that greatly enhance X's capabilities. Zero is more melee-oriented than X by using a "Z-Saber" sword. The Z-Saber's power and accuracy compensate for its lack of range; this offers the player a different form of challenge against bosses. Rather than acquiring weapons from the bosses (with the exception of his Giga Attack), Zero learns special techniques such as the "Hienkyaku" air-dash and "Kuuenbu" double-jump. However, Zero cannot upgrade any of his body parts in this game.

The player character's maximum health can be extended by obtaining a "Heart Tank" in each of the eight stages. Two "Sub Tanks" can also be found, which can be filled with life energy and then be used to replenish the player's health at any time. Two new Tanks have been added: a "Weapon Tank (W-Tank)", which fills up special weapons; and an "EX Tank", which increases the character's default lives from two to four whenever the player continues from a save point.

Development and release
Mega Man X4 was developed by Capcom. Instead of designing the game's various pieces of artwork as he had done in the past, Keiji Inafune focused his attention on being a producer. He was also involved in creating the game's storyline, a role he described as "only slightly less than it was for X1". Instead of presenting Repliforce as blatantly evil villains like Sigma, the writing staff decided to leave them some "moral leeway". They did not want the ideals of Repliforce and the Maverick Hunters to be so black-and-white. Inafune left his former design responsibilities up to other artists that had previously worked on the Mega Man X series. Artist Haruki Suetsugu did not design its characters as he would do for later games in the series, but was given drafts in order to draw illustrations for promotional purposes. An unknown author was responsible for designing X's secret "Ultimate Armor" featured in both the game after inputting a cheat code and as a Japanese Bandai action figure. He spent four days coming up with the initial blueprint, but was told by his supervisor to go back and try again. After tinkering with the Mega Man X3 armor parts, he noticed that attaching them in specific ways made it look like an airplane. He recounted creating the armor as an extremely difficult yet fun task. He also revealed that Zero was intended to have his own Ultimate Armor, but the development team chose to not finalize it. Hitoshi Ariga had drawn a special-guest-corner comic in page 9, along with his profile.

The FMV cutscenes in Mega Man X4 were produced by IG Port's subsidiary XEBEC. The game's musical score was composed by Toshihiko Horiyama. The score also features the opening theme  and the closing theme One More Chance, both sung by Yukie Nakama. All of the game's instrumental and vocal music was compiled on the Capcom Music Generation: Rockman X1 ~ X6 soundtrack released by Suleputer in 2003. The theme songs were also included on the Rockman Theme Song Collection, published by Suleputer in 2002.

Mega Man X4 was initially developed as a Sega Saturn exclusive and slated for a June 1997 release, but it was delayed and made multi-platform. Both console versions of Mega Man X4 were released in Japan on August 1, 1997. The cover art for the Japanese Saturn version depicts Zero standing alone in a dark setting. "Usually, not having the main character on the package would be unheard of," Inafune stated. "But we had a lot of hardcore fans on the Saturn, so I figured it would be all right." A "Special Limited Pack" edition of the game included the Ultimate Armor X action figure. The American localization of the Mega Man X4 PlayStation version was originally put on hold after Sony Computer Entertainment America denied Capcom permission to release it in the United States, reportedly due to their policy against 2D games. However, after persistent talks with the company, Capcom finally convinced Sony to allow the game a release. According to a Capcom spokesperson, the reasoning behind the delay was that Mega Man X4 "had just gotten lost in Sony's back log of games waiting for approval". The PlayStation version was released in 1997, while the Saturn version came out in the early part of the following week. Customers who preordered either version of the game through Capcom's online store were given a Mega Man X4-themed T-shirt. Capcom's designated European distributor, Virgin Interactive, opted not to release the Saturn version in Europe.

Reception and legacy

Reviews for the PlayStation and Saturn console versions of Mega Man X4 have been generally positive. Critics praised the added option to play through the game as either X or Zero, noting that the drastic differences in the way the characters played the same levels added to the game's replay value. However, most of the same critics concurred that Mega Man X4s 2D side-scrolling gameplay was tired and overdone well before the game was released. In particular, GamePro and Next Generation both gave it negative reviews on the sole basis of its perceived lack of series innovation; GamePro asserted that "the gameplay's none removed from Mega Man for the NES - things are just a little bigger and a little louder," while Next Generation suggested that those interested in the game should instead "pick up Mega Man X3 in the used bin for a third of the price, since you won't miss much." However, a different GamePro critic reviewed the PlayStation version and gave it resoundingly positive review, calling it "an impressive 32-bit debut" and "a definite must-have for any action gamer's library." GameSpot took more of a middle ground, concluding that "All in all, a few more 3D effects would have been nice, but the decision to stick with a true 2D environment is bold, if somewhat outmoded. Aesthetically, Mega Man X4 is a sizeable improvement over its predecessors, but you must remember that it's only a side scroller."

A number of critics also praised the intuitive and responsive controls, gigantic bosses, and solid challenge. John Ricciardi of Electronic Gaming Monthly differed on the last point, saying that the stages are too easy, but added that "the overall experience is definitely a positive one." Electronic Gaming Monthly listed the console versions at number 78 on its "100 Best Games of All Time" in the 100th issue of the magazine in 1997, the same issue in which they reviewed the PlayStation version, citing its "significant improvement over X3, with amazingly detailed 2-D graphics, well-balanced (although slightly easy) gameplay and an awesome story with very well-acted animated cut scenes." They also listed Mega Man X4 as a runner-up for "Side-Scrolling Game of the Year" (behind Castlevania: Symphony of the Night) in its 1997 Editors' Choice Awards.

The Windows version of the game was met with much lower review scores. Tom Price of Computer Gaming World felt appeal of the game itself is limited to Mega Man and platformer fans, who likely already own at least one of the console versions of Mega Man X4. Computer Games Magazine summarized, "It's simple. If you're a Mega Man fanatic you'll love this game. If you're not, you won't. Yes, Mega Man X4 is better than Mega Man X3, but that's like saying Beach Babes from Beyond is a better movie than Redneck Zombies: it's all drek anyway, so why bother?"

Capcom expressed satisfaction with the commercial performance of Mega Man X4, which it attributed to the company's marketing campaign for the franchise's 10th anniversary. According to Famitsu sales information, the PlayStation version of the game sold 197,385 copies in Japan alone in 1997, making it the 61st best-selling game in the region for that year. In 2002, Capcom re-released the PlayStation version of the game as part of the North American Greatest Hits range, confirming that it had sold at least 350,000 units. Mega Man X4 has also been re-released in multiple budget versions in Japan including PlayStation the Best, PSone Books, and Sega Saturn Collection.

Despite derision for retaining the same gameplay formula that the Mega Man franchise had been using for a full decade, Capcom continued to use 2D side-scrolling for another two installments of the series, Mega Man X5 and X6. These three games, as well as the three installments that precede them, were included on the North American Mega Man X Collection for the Nintendo GameCube and PlayStation 2 in 2006. A mobile edition of Mega Man X4 for au and DoCoMo customers was made available for purchase in Japan. A version featuring X as a playable character was released in 2011; a version with Zero in 2012. Mega Man X4 was also released on the PlayStation Network for PlayStation 3, PlayStation Vita, and PlayStation Portable as part of the PSOne Classics line in 2014. Finally, Mega Man X4 was included in the Mega Man X Legacy Collection, a compilation released for PlayStation 4, Xbox One, Nintendo Switch, and Microsoft Windows.

References

External links
Capcom Global website
Official Rockman website 
Official website 

 
 

1997 video games
Mega Man X games
Malware in fiction
Mobile games
PlayStation (console) games
PlayStation Network games
Fiction about rebellions
Sega Saturn games
Superhero video games
Video games about impact events
Video games about terrorism
Video games developed in Japan
Video games set in the 22nd century
Video games set in outer space
Works set in computers
Windows games
Xebec (studio)